is a 2003 Japanese crime drama film directed by Toshiaki Toyoda. It was released on July 19, 2003.

Cast
Yoshio Harada as Torakichi
Ryuhei Matsuda as Michiru
Genta Dairaku as Ushiyama
Itsuji Itao as Fujio
Kazuki Kitamura
Kiyohiko Shibukawa
Koji Chihara as Kazuma
Mame Yamada as Shiratori
Onimaru as Shishido
Takako Matsu
Takuji Suzuki as Inui

Reception
The film was part of the International Competition: Long Films section at the 18th Fribourg International Film Festival. On Midnight Eye, Tom Mes said the "film witnesses the birth of an assured, mature director capable of handling multi-character storylines with confidence."

References

External links

2003 crime drama films
2003 films
Films directed by Toshiaki Toyoda
Japanese crime drama films
Fratricide in fiction
Treasure hunt films
2000s Japanese films
2000s Japanese-language films